The Ven. John Jackson D.D. was Archdeacon of Clogher from 1762 until 1783.

Jackson was born in Dublin and educated at Trinity College there. 

His father and grandfather had both been the incumbent at Santry, living at Woodlands House, the elder Jackson is mentioned in the will of Dean Swift. After curacies in Cloghran and Swords he held incumbencies at Coolock and Great Connell.

Notes

Archdeacons of Clogher
18th-century Irish Anglican priests
Christian clergy from Dublin (city)
Alumni of Trinity College Dublin
Year of birth missing
Year of death missing